Sergeant major is a rank used in various military and police organizations.

Sergeant major may also refer to:

Military appointments
Regimental sergeant major, an appointment in British and Commonwealth military organizations
Company sergeant major, an appointment in British and Commonwealth military organizations

People
Léo Major (1921–2008), Canadian army sergeant twice awarded the Distinguished Conduct Medal
Eric Clay (1922–2007), English rugby league football referee nicknamed "Sergeant Major"

Other
3-5-8, a card game
"Sgt. Major" (song), a song by Jet
Sergeant major (fish), a tropical fish (Abudefduf saxatilis)
Abrota ganga, a butterfly of Asia called the sergeant major